Wells Fargo Center is a 40-story,  tower and a five-story adjacent office building with three levels of parking below the surface in Portland, Oregon. The tower became the tallest building in the state of Oregon when it was completed in 1972.

History
The building and a connected five-story building were designed by Charles Luckman and Associates. Originally named the First National Bank Tower, the building opened on April 17, 1972, and was formally dedicated on May 25, 1972. At that time, the bank occupied the first 21 floors of the tower and the entire connected, five-story building, which is known as the Data Processing Building. The name was changed to the First Interstate Tower in 1980–81, after Western Bancorporation, the parent of First National Bank of Oregon, changed its name to First Interstate Bancorp. The current name was adopted after Wells Fargo purchased First Interstate in 1996. Upon opening in 1972, the Wells Fargo Center dwarfed all other buildings in downtown Portland. Public outcry over the tower's scale and the potential of new development to block views of Mount Hood led to height restrictions on all new development.

The public areas underwent extensive renovation in 2001, including the addition of more retail space. Renovations were completed in 2002 at a cost of $35 million. Focused on the lobby area, the work included the addition of a display on the bank's history. The center had been the headquarters of Willamette Industries until 2003, when that company was bought by Weyerhaeuser. In November 2017, Starwood Capital Group purchased the tower and adjacent carriage building from Wells Fargo.

Details
Wells Fargo Center contains the regional headquarters of Wells Fargo Bank. The tower is located in Downtown Portland, in the block bounded by Southwest Fourth and Fifth Avenues between Southwest Columbia and Jefferson Streets. A skyway connects the tower to the adjacent five-story Data Processing Building, which is also part of the Wells Fargo Center. The main bank lobby is home to an authentic 1870 stagecoach from Wells Fargo's past.

Architectural details include extensive use of marble. The exterior of the building has columns of bronze-tinted glass, white Italian marble, and anodized aluminum running the entire height of the building.

Reception
The design of the building has been criticized for a variety of architectural issues. Ivan Doig, writing about Portland for The New York Times in 1976, stated the building was "huge and sleek and featureless".

Museum
A branch of the Wells Fargo History Museum is located in the building's lobby. The museum's exhibits include an 1854 stagecoach, telegraph and mining equipment, and displays about the company's use of steamboats along the Columbia and Willamette Rivers.

See also
List of tallest buildings by U.S. state
Architecture of Portland, Oregon
List of tallest buildings in Portland, Oregon

References

External links

Wells Fargo Center official website

1972 establishments in Oregon
Bank buildings in Oregon
Office buildings completed in 1972
Skyscraper office buildings in Portland, Oregon
Wells Fargo buildings